Tommy Blaize (born 5 March 1963) is a vocalist, composer, pianist, and guitarist.  He is best known as a vocalist on BBC One's Strictly Come Dancing.

Blaize has been singing professionally since the age of 9. He has worked with some of the world's most renowned artists, including Stevie Wonder, Queen, The Beach Boys, Diana Ross, Amy Winehouse, Phil Collins, Robbie Williams, Joe Cocker, and more.

In October 2017 it was announced that Blaize would release his debut album, Life & Soul, featuring covers of classic soul tracks, on 1 December. The album reached the top 40 of the UK Albums Chart.

On 23 December 2019, Blaize appeared in the season premiere of The Goes Wrong Show, "The Spirit of Christmas", as himself.

References

1963 births
20th-century Black British male singers
21st-century Black British male singers
British television personalities
English people of Nigerian descent
Living people